Dievoet is a place name from which the surnames Van Dievoet and Vandievoet are derived.

Surname 

As a surname, it is found mainly in Belgium as Van Dievoet or Vandievoet, and may refer to:

Members of the Van Dievoet family of Brussels (Vandive in Paris) (Divutius in Latin) such as:

Philippe Van Dievoet called Vandive (1654–1738), goldsmith and jeweller
Peter Van Dievoet (1661–1729), sculptor and designer of ornamental architectural features in London and Brussels
Guillaume Van Dievoet (1680–1706), printer of the Dauphin
Nicolas Felix Van Dievoet (1710–1792), counsellor of the king of France
Augustus Van Dievoet (1803–1865), in Latin Augustus Divutius, Belgian jurist, lawyer, historian and Latin writer
Jules Van Dievoet (1844–1917), Belgian jurist and lawyer
Eugène Van Dievoet (1862–1937), Belgian architect
Henri Van Dievoet (1869−1931), Belgian architect
Gabriel Van Dievoet (1875–1934), Belgian decorator and sgraffitist
Germaine Van Dievoet (1899–1990), Belgian olympic swimmer
Florence Van Dievoet née Descampe (1969–), Belgian professional golfer
Léon Van Dievoet (1907–1993), Belgian architect, painter, engraver and drawer.

Members of the family of Belgian politician Baron Émile van Dievoet such as:

 Baron Émile van Dievoet (1886–1967), Belgian minister of Justice
 Guido van Dievoet (nl), Belgian law historian
 Walter van Dievoet (nl; fr), Belgian expert on goldsmithing ;

Members of the Vandievoet or Van Dievoet families, Brabantian families from the villages of Haren, Diegem, Evere, Schaerbeek, Meise, in Flemish Brabant such as:

Jules Vandievoet (fr) (1885–1947), Belgian painter
Jacques Vandievoet (fr) (1923–1993), Belgian poet
Hendrik Van Dievoet (nl; fr), burgomaster of Meise from 1891 to 1904.

Place name 
Dievoet is a place located in Uccle (Belgium).

Etymologies
There are two possible etymologies :

Diet + voorde, place name of Germanic origin.
 From Diet meaning people and voorde meaning ford. Dietvoorde thus meaning "public ford".
Divo + ritum, place name of Celtic origin.
 Divoritum meaning "sacred ford".

For more informations about the etymologies of the name, see Dievoort.

Variations

 Dievoort, a related surname and place name

References 

Surnames of Dutch origin
Surnames
Place names
Surnames of Belgian origin
Dutch-language surnames